Salvador Quiroz (1892–1956) was a Mexican film actor.

Selected filmography 
 Michael Strogoff (1944)
 Summer Hotel (1944)
 My Memories of Mexico (1944)
 The Black Ace (1944)
The Disobedient Son (1945)
 Twilight (1945)
 A Day with the Devil (1945)
 Confessions of a Taxi Driver (1949)
 Love for Love (1950)
 The Doorman (1950)
 The Lovers (1951)
 Maria Islands (1951)
 What Has That Woman Done to You? (1951)
 My General's Women (1951)
 We Maids (1951)
 Crime and Punishment (1951)
 Women's Prison (1951)
 They Say I'm a Communist (1951)
 Full Speed Ahead (1951)
 Hotel Room (1953)
 The Photographer (1953)
 When I Leave (1954)
 A Tailored Gentleman (1954) 
 Pablo and Carolina (1957)

References

Bibliography 
 Kohner, Pancho. Lupita Tovar The Sweetheart of Mexico. Xlibris Corporation, 2011.

External links 
 

1892 births
1956 deaths
Mexican male film actors
Male actors from Morelos
People from Cuautla
20th-century Mexican male actors